Nepotilla marmorata is a species of sea snail, a marine gastropod mollusk in the family Raphitomidae.

Daphnella marmorata (Verco, 1909) is a junior homonym of Daphnella marmorata Hinds, 1844

Description
Joseph Verco (1909) and J.K. Tucker (2004) considered this species as a variety of Nepotilla minuta. Verco described it as beautifully marbled with flames of white and deep blackish-brown. 

Charles Hedley (1922) considered it as a variety of Nepotilla mimica

Distribution
This marine species is endemic to Australia and occurs off New South Wales, South Australia and Tasmania

References

External links
 

marmorata
Gastropods described in 1909